The following is an alphabetical list of topics related to the Republic of Ecuador.

0–9

.ec – Internet country code top-level domain for Ecuador

A
Adjacent countries:

Americas
South America
Islands of Ecuador
Pacific Ocean
Archipiélago de Colón (Galápagos Islands)
Golfo de Guayaquil (Gulf of Guayaquil)
Archipiélago de Colón
Asociación de Scouts del Ecuador
Atlas of Ecuador

C
Cantons of Ecuador
Capital of Ecuador:  San Francisco de Quito
Categories:
:Category:Ecuador
:Category:Buildings and structures in Ecuador
:Category:Communications in Ecuador
:Category:Crime in Ecuador
:Category:Economy of Ecuador
:Category:Ecuador stubs
:Category:Ecuador templates
:Category:Ecuadorian culture
:Category:Ecuadorian people
:Category:Ecuador-related lists
:Category:Education in Ecuador
:Category:Environment of Ecuador
:Category:Geography of Ecuador
:Category:Government of Ecuador
:Category:Health in Ecuador

:Category:History of Ecuador
:Category:Images of Ecuador
:Category:Law of Ecuador
:Category:Military of Ecuador
:Category:Politics of Ecuador
:Category:Science and technology in Ecuador
:Category:Society of Ecuador
:Category:Sport in Ecuador
:Category:Transportation in Ecuador
commons:Category:Ecuador
Centro de Levantamientos Integrados de Recursos Naturales por Sensores Remotos
Chimborazo – highest mountain peak in Ecuador and the farthest point on the surface of the Earth from the center of the Earth.
Chongon Colonche Range
Coat of arms of Ecuador
Communications in Ecuador
Cuenca
Culture of Ecuador

D
Demographics of Ecuador
Department of Aerospace Development (Ecuador)
Dirección de la Industria Aeronáutica

E
Economy of Ecuador
Ecuador
Ecuadorian space agency
Ecuadorian-United States relations
Ecuadorian painters
Equator

F

Flag of Ecuador
Foreign relations of Ecuador

G
Galápagos Islands
Geography of Ecuador
Golfo de Guayaquil
Guayaquil – Most populous city of Ecuador
Gulf of Guayaquil

H
History of Ecuador
History of the Ecuadorian-Peruvian territorial dispute
Hogar de Cristo, Guayaquil
Hospital Carlos Andrade Marín

I
Instituto Tecnológico Superior Aeronáutico
International Organization for Standardization (ISO)
ISO 3166-1 alpha-2 country code for Ecuador: EC
ISO 3166-1 alpha-3 country code for Ecuador: ECU
ISO 3166-2:EC region codes for Ecuador
Islands of Ecuador

J
Juan Tanca Marengo

L
Latin America
Lists related to Ecuador:
Diplomatic missions of Ecuador
List of cities in Ecuador
List of diplomatic missions in Ecuador
List of Ecuadorian artists
List of Ecuadorian painters
List of Ecuadorian provinces by area
List of Ecuadorian Universities
List of Ecuadorians
List of Ecuador-related topics
List of football clubs in Ecuador
List of heads of state of Ecuador
List of high schools in Ecuador
List of islands of Ecuador
List of mountains in Ecuador
List of national parks in Ecuador
List of political parties in Ecuador
List of universities in Ecuador
List of urban parishes of Guayaquil
Topic outline of Ecuador

M
Military of Ecuador
Music of Ecuador

N
National anthem of Ecuador
National Congress of Ecuador
Northern Hemisphere and Southern Hemisphere

O

Orellana Province

P
Politics of Ecuador
Provinces of Ecuador
Public holidays in Ecuador

Q
Quito – Capital of Ecuador since 1830 and the second most populous city

R
Religion in Ecuador
Republic of Ecuador (República del Ecuador, literally "Republic of the Equator")

S
"¡Salve, Oh Patria!"
San Francisco de Quito – Capital of Ecuador
Southern Hemisphere and Northern Hemisphere
Spanish colonization of the Americas
Spanish conquest of the Inca Empire
Spanish language

T
Topic outline of Ecuador
Transport in Ecuador
Tropics

U
United Nations founding member state 1945

W
Water supply and sanitation in Ecuador

Wikipedia:WikiProject Library of Congress Country Studies/Ecuador

See also

List of international rankings
Lists of country-related topics
Topic outline of Ecuador
Topic outline of geography
Topic outline of South America
United Nations

External links

Ecuador